Arvind Tulsiram Kamble (28 February 1952 – 29 December 2009) was an Indian politician who was a member of 8th Lok Sabha from Osmanabad (Lok Sabha constituency) in Maharashtra, India.

Kamble was born in Udgir, Latur district, Maharashtra. He was elected to 9th, 10th and 12th Lok Sabha from Osmanabad. Kamble died from swine flu on 29 December 2009, at the age of 57.

References

1952 births
2009 deaths
People from Latur district
India MPs 1984–1989
India MPs 1989–1991
India MPs 1991–1996
India MPs 1998–1999
People from Osmanabad district
Maharashtra politicians
Lok Sabha members from Maharashtra
Living people
Indian National Congress politicians from Maharashtra